Federal Highway 37D is a Mexican toll highway in Michoacán and Guerrero. It connects Highway 14D at Uruapan to Lázaro Cárdenas. The road is operated by Autopistas Michoacán, which charges a toll of 307 pesos per car to travel the full length of Highway 37D.

Highway 14D from Pátzcuaro southwest, along with the entirety of Highway 37D, are together referred to as the Autopista Siglo XXI.

References

External links
Autopistas Michoacán website

Mexican Federal Highways